YR Media (formerly Youth Radio) is a national network of young journalists and artists collaborating with peers across the country and media professionals to create impactful content. YR Media has operated as a non-profit production company in the Bay Area for 25 years, starting in Berkeley, CA and moving to downtown Oakland, CA in 2007. 

YR was founded by Ellin O'Leary. O' Leary founded Youth Radio in 1992 and served as its first Executive Director. YR aims to invest in future generations by championing the voices of young people and helping build crucial skills in journalism, arts and media.

YR has partnered with outlets including Teen Vogue, NPR, Pandora, and NYTimes to further amplify the work of young journalists and artists, and their work has been recognized by awards including the George Foster Peabody Award, Edward R. Murrow Award, and Alfred I. duPont-Columbia University Award.

Mission

YR Media’s mission is to launch young people on education and career pathways in media, technology and creative arts. More than 75% of the high school students they serve each year are low-income or from communities of color. Many are from underserved schools.

YR Media Methodology

 Education: YR Media provides six months of digital media and technology education to diverse, low-income 14-to-24-year-old young people throughout the Bay Area in journalism, music production, design and code.

 Employment: Program graduates are eligible for jobs throughout Youth Radio’s Peabody Award-winning media production company.

 Support Services: Participants receive wraparound services including case management, referrals to partner service providers, nutritional support and academic/career advising to support the realization of their personal goals.

Impact

 YR Media journalism reaches an audience of 30 million people.
 Last year, YR Media students had a 97% high school graduation rate and an 87% college enrollment rate.
 YR Media provides more than 250 paid internships per year to young people and our externship program provides direct employment in the communications sector.
 YR Media services are provided at no cost to participating youth.

History

Founded in 1993 in Berkeley during a period of heightened youth violence and homicide, Youth Radio was established as an outlet for Bay Area youth to process their experiences and provide an alternative perspective to the prevailing media dialogue. In 2007, Youth Radio moved its headquarters to downtown Oakland, helping transform an under-invested part of the city into a world-class center of art, commerce, and culture. In 2012, Youth Radio reported on the importance of the youth vote at the Democratic National Convention in Charlotte, North Carolina.

Youth Radio operates bureaus in Los Angeles, Atlanta, and Washington, D.C. The flagship of Youth Radio is located in downtown Oakland on Broadway and 17th street.

Selected accolades
 George Foster Peabody Award – 2001, 2011
 Edward R. Murrow Award – 2001, 2005, 2010, 2011
 Robert F. Kennedy Journalism Award–2010
 President’s Committee on the Arts and the Humanities Award – 2012
 Red Cross Heroes Award – 2010
 Alfred I. duPont-Columbia University Award – 2000

Divisions of YR Media
ADP.FM / All Day Play: YR Media's eclectic online radio station, featuring music from emerging artists and diverse subgenres. Get exposed to a wide spectrum of musical tastes, news, and commentary from Youth Radio’s all-stars, plus mix shows from top Bay Area DJs. ADP.FM will be going off-air permanently at midnight December 16th, 2022. 

Remix Your Life: YR Media's music production and distribution label.

Adult ISH: A first-of-its-kind, culture, storytelling and advice podcast produced by those who are almost adults. 24-year-olds Nyge Turner (Oakland) and Merk Nguyen (Los Angeles) host conversations with artists, tastemakers and theirs friends about mental health, culture, and more.

Notes

External links

YR Media
Facebook
Twitter
YouTube
Instagram
All Day Play Live Stream

Education in Oakland, California
Non-profit organizations based in California
Organizations based in Oakland, California
Peabody Award winners
Youth empowerment organizations
Youth-led media